Jean-Luc Coatalem (18 September 1959, Paris) is a French journalist and writer.

Biography 
In the wake of a family of officers, Jean-Luc Coatalem spent his childhood in Polynesia and his adolescence in Madagascar. The incessant removals gave him the taste of elsewhere and would make him bulimic of travels and reports.

He explored nearly eighty countries, "on foot, on horseback, in ultralight and on ice-breakers". In particular, he produced two accounts on Chiloé Island in Chile and Labrador which drew attention on him.

Coming to his thirties, this traveler, novelist, writer and essayist writer for whom "all travel ends in books and everything starts from a reading", published wandering narratives (Mission au Paraguay, Suite indochinoise...) and humorous novels (Capitaine, Le Fils du fakir).

In 1992, he was with Nicolas Bouvier and Gilles Lapouge one of the nine signatories of the "Manifesto for a traveling literature" published under the aegis of Michel Le Bris.

In 2001, Je suis dans les mers du Sud, a very personal essay that he drew from an investigation on Paul Gauguin, was distinguished by numerous awards, including the Prix Breizh 2002 and was translated into English and Chinese. He confirmed his notoriety two years later by an ode to geography and wandering, La consolation des voyages.

Jean-Luc Coatalem no longer hesitates to approach intimist writing. Il faut se quitter déjà published in 2008, is a melancholic account of a non passionate love wandering between Buenos Aires and Montevideo. Le Dernier roi d'Angkor, inspired by the difficult adoption of a Cambodian orphan, evokes the indescribable tear of a past abolished.

His last work, Fortune de mer was published by Stock editor in 2015.

Passionate about art and graphic design, he participated in parallel to works or catalogs around the sculptor Denis Monfleur at editions la Table ronde, the painter François Dilasser at editions La Navire, but also developed a fruitful collaboration with his accomplice and friend Jacques de Loustal. They jointly signed three albums with Casterman.

Works 
1988: Zone tropicale, Le Dilettante
1989: Fièvre jaune, Le Dilettante
1991: Capitaine, Flammarion
1992: Triste sire, Le Dilettante
1992: Affaires indigènes, Groupe Flammarion
1993: Suite indochinoise, Le Dilettante
1994 :Villa Zaouche, Grasset
1995: Tout est factice, Grasset
1996: Concession 126, Éditions du Rocher
1997: Les Beaux Horizons, Le Dilettante
1998: Mission Paraguay,  Voyageurs
1998: Le Fils du fakir, Grasset
2001: Je suis dans les mers du Sud, Grasset
2004: La consolation des voyages, Grasset
2008: Il faut se quitter déjà, Grasset
2010: Le Dernier roi d'Angkor, Grasset
2012: Le gouverneur d’Antipodia, Le Dilettante 
2013: Nouilles froides à Pyongyang, Grasset
2013: Avec les Indiens du bout du monde - Les sept voyages du  au Cap Horn, in Aventuriers du monde - Les archives des explorateurs français, 1827-1914., Éditions de l'Iconoclaste, .
2015: Fortune de mer, Stock

Distinctions 
 1998: Bourse Cino del Duca
 2001: Prix Amerigo Vespucci, Prix Tristan Corbière
 2002: Prix des Deux Magots, Prix Breizh
 2012: Prix Roger Nimier for Le gouverneur d’Antipodia, Éditions Le Dilettante.
 2012: Prix des lecteurs of Le Maine Libre

Bibliography 
Services de documentation, Notice biographique Jean-Luc Coatalem - 54 ans - Romancier, nouvelliste, reporter., Radio France, Paris, 5 avril 2013.

References

External links 
 Jean-Luc Coatalem on the site "Lettres du Mékong"
 Jean-Luc Coatalem on Babelio
 Jean-Luc Coatalem on France Inter
 Jean-Luc Coatalem on France Culture
 Jean-Luc Coatalem, Dialogues littéraires on YouTube

20th-century French writers
21st-century French writers
French travel writers
20th-century French journalists
21st-century French journalists
Prix des Deux Magots winners
Roger Nimier Prize winners
Writers from Paris
1959 births
Living people
Prix Femina essai winners